Earl Stephen Bishop (born November 14, 1951) is an American singer-songwriter, actor, and guitarist. His biggest hits include "On and On", "It Might Be You" and "Save It for a Rainy Day". He has appeared in and contributed musically to many motion pictures, including National Lampoon's Animal House.

Life and career

Beginnings 
Bishop was born and raised in San Diego, California, and attended Will C. Crawford High School. Originally a clarinetist, he persuaded his brother to buy him a guitar after seeing the Beatles on The Ed Sullivan Show. In 1967, he formed his first group, the Weeds, a British Invasion-styled band.

After the Weeds folded, Bishop moved to Los Angeles in search of a solo recording contract. During a lean eight-year period, where he was rejected "by nearly every label and producer," he continued to write songs, eventually landing a $50-a-week job with a publishing house.

Bishop's break came when a friend, Leah Kunkel, gave Art Garfunkel one of Bishop's demo tapes. Garfunkel chose two of his songs, "Looking for the Right One" and "The Same Old Tears on a New Background", to record for the platinum album Breakaway. Via Garfunkel's patronage, Bishop finally secured a recording contract with ABC Records in 1976.

Recording career 
Bishop's first album, Careless, included two of his biggest hits. The first single released, "Save It for a Rainy Day", introduced Bishop to the listening public and went to number 22 on the Billboard singles chart. The next single, Bishop's highest charting to date, "On and On", peaked at No. 11. The album itself rose to number 34 on the Billboard albums chart. Eric Clapton, Art Garfunkel and Chaka Khan all contributed their talents to the album.

Careless went gold, as did Bishop's subsequent album Bish, released in 1978. Bish included one charting single, "Everybody Needs Love", which made it to number 32. The album also includes a smooth classic called "A Fool At Heart" that features Chaka Khan and Natalie Cole on background vocals. Bishop's third album, Red Cab to Manhattan, released in 1980, failed to chart and was his last released in North America for nine years.

Bishop has written and performed music for many motion pictures. In 1978, he contributed the original song "Dream Girl" and theme to National Lampoon's Animal House, which he sang in falsetto. In 1980, Bishop contributed backing vocals to "This Must Be Love", from Phil Collins' debut solo album Face Value. Bishop's next hit, charting at number 25 in 1982, was "It Might Be You", the theme from the movie Tootsie, unusual in that it was not penned by Bishop. Written by Dave Grusin, Alan Bergman, and Marilyn Bergman, it was nominated for an Academy Award for Best Original Song.

Bishop's composition "Separate Lives", sung by Phil Collins and Marilyn Martin, from the 1985 movie White Nights, was nominated for an Academy Award for Best Original Song, losing to "Say You, Say Me" from the same film. Bishop wrote the song about his breakup with actress Karen Allen, who also appeared in Animal House. Bishop said: "I write much better when I'm heartbroken and sad or melancholy."

Other movie music includes: "Somewhere in Between" (written and performed) from The China Syndrome (1979), "Your Precious Love" (performed with Yvonne Elliman) from Roadie (1980), "If Love Takes You Away" (written and performed) from Summer Lovers (1982), "Unfaithfully Yours (One Love)" (written and performed) from Unfaithfully Yours (1984), "Something New in My Life" (performed) from Micki & Maude (1984), "The Heart Is So Willing" (performed) from The Money Pit (1986), "All I Want" (performed) from All I Want for Christmas (1991), and "You Can Do Anything" (written and performed by Bishop and Jeff Jones) from Barney's Great Adventure (1998). In addition, the original version of "Walkin' on Air" (written and performed by Bishop) was featured in the 1986 film The Boy Who Could Fly.

In 1989, Bishop released the album Bowling in Paris with Phil Collins (co-producer on some songs), Eric Clapton and Sting contributing. The album included a revamped version of "Walkin' on Air", this time featuring drumming, production, and additional vocals from Collins. This version became a #13 hit on the Adult Contemporary chart. In 1987, the Norwegian swing/pop duo Bobbysocks! had recorded their own version of "Walking on Air" (as "Walkin' on Air") as the title track to their album Walkin' on Air.

Other appearances
Bishop has appeared in several motion pictures as a "charming" character, including four directed by John Landis. He had a cameo role, billed as "Charming Guy", in The Kentucky Fried Movie (1977), appearing as a hustler in the infamous "Catholic High School Girls in Trouble" segment. In addition to singing the theme song off-screen, Bishop had a cameo, billed as "Charming Guy with Guitar", in National Lampoon's Animal House (1978), as the aspiring folk singer whose guitar John Belushi smashes. Bishop still keeps the smashed guitar as a memento. 

He appeared in The Blues Brothers (1980), billed as "Charming Trooper", who breaks his watch during the mall chase. He appeared, very briefly, in Twilight Zone: The Movie (1983), billed as "Charming G.I.", in the Vietnam War scene. Bishop also appeared, as "Blue London", in Harry Jaglom's Someone to Love (1987).

Eric Clapton mentioned Bishop in his autobiography as one of his favorite singer-songwriters.

Other artists
Numerous artists have recorded songs written by Bishop. These include:
 Aswad – "On and On"
 Patti Austin – "It Might Be You"
 Eric Clapton – "Holy Mother"
 Phil Collins & Marilyn Martin – "Separate Lives"
 Jonathan Coulton - "On and On"
 David Crosby – "Natalie"
 Shelley Duvall – "Tiny Pillow"
 Yvonne Elliman – "Sailing Ships"
 Four Tops – "Save It for a Rainy Day"
 Frida – "Tell Me It's Over"
 Art Garfunkel – "Looking for the Right One", "The Same Old Tears on a New Background", "Sail on a Rainbow", "One Less Holiday", "Slow Breakup", "King of Tonga", "If Love Takes You Away"
 Patricia Kaas – "When I Was in Love"
 Leah Kunkel – "A Fool at Heart", "Under the Jamaican Moon"
 Cheryl Ladd – "Rock and Roll Slave"
 Cleo Laine – "One More Night"
 Kenny Loggins – "Give It Half a Chance"
 Johnny Mathis – "One More Night", "Let Your Heart Remember"
 Megon McDonough – "Not the Same Woman"
 Stephanie Mills – "Give It Half a Chance"
 Luciano Pavarotti – "Holy Mother"
 Steve Perry – "Donna Please"
 Kenny Rankin – "On and On"
 Helen Reddy – "One More Night"
 Rumer − "Separate Lives"
 Diane Schuur – "Red Cab to Manhattan"
 Phoebe Snow – "Never Letting Go"
 James Lee Stanley – "Every Minute"
 Barbra Streisand – "One More Night"

Discography

Albums
 Careless (1976)
 Bish (1978)
 Red Cab to Manhattan (1980)
 Sleeping with Girls (1985; Asia only)
 Bowling in Paris (1989; re-released in 2015 with different sequencing and cover)
 Blue Guitars (1996; released in 1994 in Japan with different tracks and cover)
 Happy Bishmas (2002; re-released in 2003 with different cover)
 Yardwork (2002; released in Japan with different cover)
 The Demo Album 1 (2003)
 The Demo Album 2 (2003)
 Fear of Massage: Demo 3 (2003)
 Stephen Bishop Live at Duo Music Exchange (2006; Japan only)
 America & Friends: Live at the Ventura Theater (2007; Japan only)
 Saudade (2007; Target-only release. Re-released worldwide as Romance in Rio)
 Romance in Rio (2008)
 Be Here Then (2014)
 Stephen Bishop Live (2014; also issued 2015 as The '70s: Stephen Bishop with series cover)
 Blueprint (2016)
 We'll Talk About It Later In The Car (2019)

Collections
 Best of Bish (1988)
 On and On: The Hits of Stephen Bishop (1994)
 An Introduction to Stephen Bishop (1997)
 Back to Back (1999; split title with Michael Johnson)
 The Millennium Collection (2002)

Singles

References

External links 

Fan Site show of February 8, 2014

1951 births
American male singer-songwriters
Singer-songwriters from California
American rock songwriters
American rock singers
American soft rock musicians
American male film actors
American male television actors
Television personalities from California
Musicians from San Diego
Living people
Writers from San Diego
Male actors from San Diego